Bipolar coordinates are a two-dimensional orthogonal coordinate system based on the Apollonian circles. Confusingly, the same term is also sometimes used for two-center bipolar coordinates. There is also a third system, based on two poles (biangular coordinates).  

The term "bipolar" is further used on occasion to describe other curves having two singular points (foci), such as ellipses, hyperbolas, and Cassini ovals.  However, the term bipolar coordinates is reserved for the coordinates described here, and never used for systems associated with those other curves, such as elliptic coordinates.

Definition 
The system is based on two foci F1 and F2. Referring to the figure at right, the σ-coordinate of a point P equals the angle F1 P F2, and the τ-coordinate equals the natural logarithm of the ratio of the distances d1 and d2:

If, in the Cartesian system, the foci are taken to lie at (−a, 0) and (a, 0), the coordinates of the point P are

The coordinate σ is only defined modulo 2π, and is best taken to range from -π to π, by taking it as the negative of the acute angle F1 P F2 if P is in the lower half plane.

Proof that coordinate system is orthogonal 

The equations for x and y can be combined to give

This equation shows that σ and τ are the real and imaginary parts of an analytic function of x+iy (with logarithmic branch points at the foci), which in turn proves (by appeal to the general theory of conformal mapping) (the Cauchy-Riemann equations) that these particular curves of σ and τ intersect at right angles, i.e., that the coordinate system is orthogonal.

Curves of constant σ and τ 

The curves of constant σ correspond to non-concentric circles 

that intersect at the two foci.  The centers of the constant-σ circles lie on the y-axis.  Circles of positive σ are centered above the x-axis, whereas those of negative σ lie below the axis.  As the magnitude |σ|- π/2 decreases, the radius of the circles decreases and the center approaches the origin (0, 0), which is reached when |σ| = π/2.  (From elementary geometry, all triangles on a circle with 2 vertices on opposite ends of a diameter are right triangles.)

The curves of constant  are non-intersecting circles of different radii

that surround the foci but again are not concentric. The centers of the constant-τ circles lie on the x-axis.  The circles of positive τ lie in the right-hand side of the plane (x > 0), whereas the circles of negative τ lie in the left-hand side of the plane (x < 0).  The τ = 0 curve corresponds to the y-axis (x = 0).  As the magnitude of τ increases, the radius of the circles decreases and their centers approach the foci.

Reciprocal relations
The passage from the Cartesian coordinates towards the bipolar coordinates can be done via the following formulas:

and

The coordinates also have the identities: 

and

which is the limit one would get a x = 0 from the definition in the section above.  And all the limits look quite ordinary at x =0.

Scale factors 

Multiplying this equation with its complex conjugate yields

Employing the trigonometric identities for products of sines and cosines, we obtain

from which it follows that

Hence the scale factors for σ and τ are equal, and given by

Many results now follow in quick succession from the general formulae for orthogonal coordinates.
Thus, the infinitesimal area element equals

and the Laplacian is given by 

Applications
The classic applications of bipolar coordinates are in solving partial differential equations, e.g., Laplace's equation or the Helmholtz equation, for which bipolar coordinates allow a separation of variables.  An example is the electric field surrounding two parallel cylindrical conductors with unequal diameters.

Extension to 3-dimensions
Bipolar coordinates form the basis for several sets of three-dimensional orthogonal coordinates.

The bipolar cylindrical coordinates are produced by translating the bipolar coordinates along the z-axis, i.e., the out-of-plane axis.

The bispherical coordinates are produced by rotating the bipolar coordinates about the x-axis, i.e., the axis connecting the foci.

The toroidal coordinates are produced by rotating the bipolar coordinates about the y-axis, i.e., the axis separating the foci.

References

 
 Korn GA and Korn TM. (1961) Mathematical Handbook for Scientists and Engineers, McGraw-Hill.

Two-dimensional coordinate systems
Orthogonal coordinate systems